Mechanics Bank Arena is a multi-purpose arena in Bakersfield, California. Located downtown at the corner of Truxtun Avenue and N Street, it was built in 1998, and was originally known as Centennial Garden, a name submitted by local resident Brian Landis   Bay Area-based Mechanics Bank has held the naming rights since September 2019, following their merger with Rabobank NA, which had held the naming rights since 2005.

About
The arena is home to the Bakersfield Condors, an ice hockey team in the American Hockey League and is the primary home arena to the California State University, Bakersfield Roadrunners club ice hockey team (ACHA Division II). Mechanics Bank Arena is also the current home to the California Interscholastic Federation High School State Wrestling Championship Tournament held the first weekend in March.  As a concert venue, the arena seats 6,400 for half-house shows and up to 10,225 for center stage and end-stage shows. The arena floor measures  of total space.

The southern concourse of Mechanics Bank Arena serves as the exhibit home of the Bob Elias Kern County Sports Hall of Fame. The  Hall of Fame honors athletes and people involved with athletics from Bakersfield and Kern County. They include nationally prominent athletes, local coaches, and others who have made a significant contribution to athletics. A separate display on the western concourse honors the founders of Bakersfield and Kern County, as well as country music legend Buck Owens and current athletes and dignitaries from Bakersfield and Kern County.

Attached to the arena is the Mechanics Bank Theater and Convention Center, a  exhibit hall and 3,000-seat theater. The complex was known as the Bakersfield Civic Auditorium when it opened in 1962 and was renamed the Bakersfield Convention Center in the 1980s.

In front of the arena is a city parkspace, Centennial Plaza. The Plaza has a large fountain, a stage, a sculpture fountain, art work, and bricks commemorating the City of Bakersfield's Centennial as an incorporated city in 1998. The community was founded in 1869 by Colonel Thomas Baker.

In their first year in the Western Athletic Conference, the Roadrunners men's and women's basketball teams moved into Rabobank Arena now Mechanics Bank Arena full-time but they moved back to campus for the 2014-15 season.  Also in recent years, ASM Global has taken over management of the Arena. The venue has hosted NCAA Division II Elite Eight tournaments, The California Interscholastic Federation State High School Wrestling Championship Tournament, PBR rodeos, monster truck shows, NHL and NBA pre-season games hosting the Los Angeles Lakers and Los Angeles Kings, World Wrestling Entertainment televised shows, the ECHL All-Star Game, an annual high school all-star football game played under Arena Football rules, conventions, Disney On Ice, Olympic Figure Skating Shows, and numerous concerts featuring musical acts of various genres, including The Eagles, hometown band Korn, and Brad Paisley.

 On September 25, 1998, PCL Construction ceremoniously handed over the keys of the Centennial Garden Arena(original name) to the City Of Bakersfield, hosting the "PCL Construction Party" for construction workers, builders, architects, City Officials, family and friends, as Mayor "Bob" Price set the last tile to the wall in the foyer. Entertainment for the event was provided by the Wayne-Russell Band, featuring Ronnie Wayne-guitar/vocals, Billy Russell-guitar/vocals, Gary Branson-bass/vocals, and David Wulfekuehler-drums. This marked the band as the very first entertainment to perform inside the arena. Bill Cosby was the first publicly ticketed entertainment inside, on October 2, 1998.

See also
 List of NCAA Division I basketball arenas

External links
Arena website
Condors Hockey
City of Bakersfield
CSUB Athletics
CIF High School Sports
Ice Sports Center
McMurtrey Aquatic Center

References

Cal State Bakersfield Roadrunners men's basketball
College basketball venues in the United States
Music venues in California
Indoor ice hockey venues in California
Defunct NBA G League venues
Basketball venues in California
Sports venues in Bakersfield, California
Wrestling venues in California
1998 establishments in California
Sports venues completed in 1998
Indoor arenas in California